The 2011 Ligas Superiores, the fifth division of Peruvian football (soccer), will be played by variable number teams by Departament. The tournaments will be played on a home-and-away round-robin basis.

Liga Superior de Ancash

Liga Superior de Cajamarca

Final

Liga Superior del Callao

Serie A

Serie B

Semifinals

Liga Superior de Lambayeque

Liga Superior de Piura

Liga Superior de Puno

Liga Superior de Tumbes

Final

External links
 DeChalaca.com - copaperu.pe la información más completa del "fútbol macho" en todo el Perú

2011
5